Gildardo Biderman Gómez Monsálvez (born 13 October 1963, Medellín) is a Colombian former footballer who played as defender specially in Atlético Nacional, where he won Copa Libertadores title, and Independiente Medellín. He was in the same generation from other good players in his position like León Villa and Luis Fernando Herrera. Gómez Monsálvez played 1990 FIFA World Cup in Italy.

References

Sources

1963 births
Living people
Colombian footballers
Footballers from Medellín
Independiente Medellín footballers
Millonarios F.C. players
Atlético Nacional footballers
Categoría Primera A players
Colombia international footballers
1989 Copa América players
1990 FIFA World Cup players
21st-century Mexican politicians
Association football defenders